Westfield Stratford City is a shopping centre in Stratford, east London, which opened on 13 September 2011.

Originally fully owned by the Westfield Group, in November 2010 ABP Pension Fund and CPP Investment Board each purchased a 25% shareholding, with Westfield retaining 50%.  Westfield's holding is now owned by Unibail-Rodamco-Westfield following Unibail-Rodamco's acquisition of Westfield Corporation in 2018.

Westfield Stratford City is adjacent to the London Olympic Park, International Quarter London, East Village, Stratford Regional and Stratford International stations. The shopping centre is part of a large multi-purpose development project called Stratford City. It is promoted as contributing significantly to the local economy, with the creation of up to 10,000 permanent jobs including 2,001 going to local people. However, there are counter-reports of significant harm to other local businesses due to the preponderance of chain stores.

The site was formerly occupied by Stratford Works and Locomotive Depot.

Retail area
The shopping centre is anchored by a  John Lewis department store, a  Waitrose supermarket, a  Marks & Spencer department store, a 24-hour casino (Aspers) and a 20 screen all-digital Vue cinema. The shopping centre also has a 267-room Premier Inn hotel, a Holiday Inn with 350 rooms and Staybridge Suites.
The shopping centre has approximately 280 stores and 70 restaurants.

Transport
To the south of the site lies Stratford station which is served by London Underground's Central and Jubilee lines, Greater Anglia, Elizabeth line, London Overground, Docklands Light Railway, and a number of c2c services. To the north lies Stratford International station, which is served by Southeastern High Speed and Docklands Light Railway services.

Stratford bus station and Stratford City bus station are served by numerous London Buses routes and National Express and Terravision long-distance services.

According to Westfield, while the site supports a 5,000 space car park, 80% of the shoppers arrive at the centre on public transport.

In popular culture
In September 2011 Nicole Scherzinger marked the opening of Westfield Stratford City with a performance.

In January 2012, The X Factor singer Olly Murs filmed a music video for his single "Oh My Goodness" at Westfield Stratford City.

See also
Westfield London

References

External links

 Official website
 Stratford City on The Retail Database
 "The Golden Temple" Featured Documentary on Westfield, Stratford and the Olympic Games, 2012

Redevelopment projects in London
Thames Gateway
Stratford City
Shopping malls established in 2011
Tourist attractions in the London Borough of Newham
Shopping centres in the London Borough of Newham
2011 establishments in England
Stratford, London
Privately owned public spaces